Asatryan is an Armenian surname. Notable people with the surname include:

 Aram Asatryan (1953 - 2006), Armenian singer
 Bagrat Asatryan (born 1956), Armenian economist
 Hayk Asatryan (1900 - 1956), American political theorist
 Karen Asatryan (born 1974), Armenian football player
 Paytsar Asatryan (born 1999), Armenian football player
 Sona Asatryan (born 1999), Armenian chess player
 Vahagn Asatryan (1977 - 2020), Armenian military leader

Armenian-language surnames